The Auster J/2 Arrow is a 1940s British single-engined two-seat high-wing touring monoplane built by Auster Aircraft Limited at Rearsby, Leicestershire, England.

History
The Arrow was designed as a successor to the pre-war Taylorcraft Plus C monoplane. A development aircraft, a side-by-side two-seater first flew in 1946 powered by a Lycoming O-145-B3 flat four air-cooled engine.

Import restrictions on the sale in the United Kingdom (UK) of American-built engines resulted in most of the 44 aircraft completed being exported, mainly to Australia. In later life, examples were re-imported to the UK, where several examples remained active in 2011.

Specifications (J/2)

See also

References

Mike Preston and Mick Ames, 2002, "Austers", International Auster Club Heritage Group Publication,

External links

1940s British civil utility aircraft
Auster aircraft
Single-engined tractor aircraft
High-wing aircraft
Aircraft first flown in 1945